Andrew Kim (born July 12, 1982) is an American politician and former diplomat serving as the U.S. representative from New Jersey's 3rd congressional district. The district encompasses Philadelphia's eastern suburbs along southern and central New Jersey.

Kim is the first Democratic member of Congress of Korean descent, and the second overall after Jay Kim (no relation).

Early life and career
Kim was born on July 12, 1982, in Boston to Korean immigrant parents. He was raised in the Marlton section of Evesham Township, New Jersey and attended Rice Elementary School before moving to Cherry Hill and graduating from Cherry Hill High School East in 2000. After two years at Deep Springs College, Kim transferred to the University of Chicago, where he graduated Phi Beta Kappa in 2004 with a degree in political science.

During college, Kim was an intern at the United States Agency for International Development. He later received a Rhodes Scholarship and a Harry S. Truman Scholarship to study international relations at Magdalen College, Oxford. At Oxford, Kim became friends with fellow Rhodes scholar Pete Buttigieg, now the U.S. Secretary of Transportation.

Kim worked at the U.S. State Department. He served in Afghanistan as a civilian adviser to Generals David Petraeus and John R. Allen before working as a national security adviser under President Barack Obama. Kim served as a United States National Security Council official.

U.S. House of Representatives

Elections

2018 

A resident of Bordentown Township, New Jersey, Kim ran against two-term incumbent Republican Tom MacArthur in the November 6, 2018, United States House of Representatives election in New Jersey after advancing from the June Democratic primary.

Kim was endorsed by Barack Obama, former U.S. Vice President Joe Biden, New Jersey Governor Phil Murphy, and actress Piper Perabo. Kim said he was inspired to run in reaction to MacArthur's efforts to repeal the Affordable Care Act.

During the campaign, MacArthur sought to portray Kim as a D.C. elitist and outsider. In an ad run by the New Jersey Republican Party, Kim was described as "Real Fishy" in Wonton font on a picture of dead fish. The ad was criticized for its racial undertones.

The race was considered too close to call on election night, but the next night, an influx of absentee ballots in Burlington County, home to the majority of the district's voters, gave Kim a 2,500-vote lead, prompting him to declare victory. MacArthur conceded eight days later. With a margin of victory of fewer than 4,000 votes, or slightly over 1% of votes cast, this was New Jersey's closest congressional race. Kim became the first Asian American U.S. representative from New Jersey, despite running in a predominantly white district that supported Trump in 2016.

2020 

Kim ran for reelection in 2020. In the general election, he faced Republican nominee David Richter, a businessman. Richter originally planned to run against then-Democrat Jeff Van Drew in the second district, but after Van Drew switched parties, Richter decided to run against Kim in the third district. Once again, Kim's district voted for Trump.

Although the race was projected to be close, Kim won by 30,000 votes, even though he had voted to impeach Trump in 2019.

2022 

Kim ran for reelection in the district for the 2022 elections. On November 8, 2022, the Associated Press called Kim as the winner of the NJ-3 House election.

Tenure
Kim's first official action during his tenure was to vote for Nancy Pelosi as United States Speaker of the House, but he voted against her nomination during a November 2018 Democratic caucus meeting. He cited the need to reopen the government amid the ongoing government shutdown for his decision to back Pelosi.

In February 2019, Kim introduced his first bill, the Strengthening Health Care and Lowering Prescription Drug Costs Act (SAVE Act). In May, the SAVE Act passed the House, 234–183. The bill, designed to lower prescription drug costs and included a provision to prohibit brands from stopping generic versions of drugs from being sold on the market, was not expected to pass the Senate.

In June 2019, Kim co-sponsored an amendment to stop a pay raise for members of Congress.

In April 2020, House leadership appointed Kim to the House Select Subcommittee on the Coronavirus crisis.

As of November 2021, Kim had voted in line with Joe Biden's stated position 100% of the time according to FiveThirtyEight.

Policing
In 2020, Kim co-sponsored and voted for the Justice in Policing Act.

Insider trading in congress
Kim supports banning members of Congress from trading stock, saying in December 2021 that he "disagree[d] strongly" with speaker Nancy Pelosi, who defended the practice.

2020 presidential election
On January 7, 2021, after voting to certify the 2020 presidential election, Kim gained widespread media attention for a photograph of him cleaning up personal belongings left behind by the January 6th demonstrators. He donated the blue suit he wore in the photo to the Smithsonian Institution, which was collecting items from the riot.

Committee assignments
 Committee on Armed Services
 Subcommittee on Intelligence, Emerging Threats and Capabilities
 Subcommittee on Readiness (Vice Chair)
 Committee on Small Business
 Subcommittee on Economic Growth, Tax and Capital Access (Chair)
 Subcommittee on Innovation and Workforce Development
Committee on Foreign Affairs
Subcommittee on the Indo-Pacific
Subcommittee on Global Health, Global Human Rights, and International Organizations
 Select Subcommittee on the Coronavirus Crisis

Caucus memberships
 Congressional Progressive Caucus
 Congressional Asian Pacific American Caucus
 Future Forum
 Congressional Dads Caucus

Electoral history

See also
 List of Asian Americans and Pacific Islands Americans in the United States Congress

References

External links

 Congressman Andy Kim official U.S. House website
 Andy Kim for Congress official campaign site

 

|-

1982 births
21st-century American politicians
Alumni of Magdalen College, Oxford
American politicians of Korean descent
Asian-American people in New Jersey politics
Democratic Party members of the United States House of Representatives from New Jersey
American Rhodes Scholars
Cherry Hill High School East alumni
Living people
Asian-American members of the United States House of Representatives
People from Evesham Township, New Jersey
Politicians from Cherry Hill, New Jersey
University of Chicago alumni
Politicians from Boston
Deep Springs College alumni